Stockport Georgians Association Football Club is a football club based in Stockport, England. They are currently members of the North West Counties League Division One South and play at Cromley Road, Stockport.

History
Stockport Georgians were founded in 1908, competing in the Stockport Sunday League. In 1923, the club was renamed St. George's, after the church of the same name in the Heaviley area of Stockport, joining the Stockport League in the same decade, winning the league in 1926 and 1927. In 1931, Stockport Georgians joined the Lancashire & Cheshire Amateur League. In 1987, the club absorbed Adswood Amateurs, taking their place in the Manchester Football League, winning the title in their first season in the league. In 2002, the club won the Manchester Football League for the second time, adding a third title in 2015. 

In 2022, the club was admitted into the North West Counties League Division One South.

Ground
Stockport Georgians originally played at Nangreave Road, Heaviley. In 1925, the club moved to their current site in Cromley Road. Between 1970 and 1973, due to the state of the playing surface at Cromley Road, Stockport Georgians played at Woodbank Park and Davenport School.

Honours
Manchester Football League Premier Division
Champions 1987–88, 2001–02, 2014–15

As Adswood Amateurs
Manchester Football League Premier Division
Champions 1986–87

Manchester Football League Division One
Champions 1985–86

References

Football clubs in the Metropolitan Borough of Stockport
Association football clubs established in 1908
1908 establishments in England
Football clubs in England
Football clubs in Staffordshire
Manchester Football League
North West Counties Football League clubs